Grusonia bulbispina is native to Mexico. It is a member of the family Cactaceae.

References
Family ~ Cactaceae (kak-TAY-see-ee) Genus ~ Grusonia (gru-SON-ee-uh) Species ~ bulbispina
 https://web.archive.org/web/20151222130909/http://www.cactipedia.info/en/image/grusonia-bulbispina

bulbispina
Flora of Mexico